Zeita is a Palestinian town in the Tulkarm Governorate in the western West Bank, located 11 kilometers North-east of Tulkarm. According to the Palestinian Central Bureau of Statistics, Zeita had a population of 2,852 inhabitants in 2007.  21.5% of the population of Zeita were refugees in 1997. The healthcare facilities for Zeita are designated as MOH level 2.

History
Zeita is an ancient village where marble Corinthian  capitals have been reused in a local Maqam.

Pottery remains have been found here from the  Byzantine, early Muslim and the Middle Ages.

In 1265, Zeita was among the villages and estates sultan Baibars allocated to his amirs after he had expelled the Crusaders. Half of Zaita was given to emir  Jamal al-Din Aidughdi al-'Azizi, a quarter to emir Shams al-Din Ildikuz al-Karaki, and a quarter to emir Saif al-Din Qilij al-Baghdadi.

Ottoman era
The village was incorporated into the Ottoman Empire with the rest of Palestine in 1517. In the 1596 Ottoman tax records, it appeared under the name of Zaita, located in the  Nahiya Qaqun, in the Nablus Sanjak. It had a population of 91  Muslim and 7 Christian households. They  paid a fixed tax-rate of 33.3% on agricultural products, including wheat, barley, summer crops, olive trees, goats and beehives, in addition to occasional revenues and  a press for olive oil or grape syrup and a tax on people in the Nablus area; a total of 3,440  akçe.  Pottery remains from the Ottoman era have also been found here.

Zeita appears on sheet 45 Jacotin's map drawn-up during Napoleon's invasion in 1799, though its position is not accurate.  

During the 1834 Peasants' revolt in Palestine, Ibrahim Pasha of Egypt  pursued rebels  to  Zeita. Ninety rebels were slain here, while the rest fled to nearby Deir al-Ghusun. At Deir al-Ghusun, many of the inhabitants and rebels heeded a call by Husayn Abd al-Hadi to flee once the Egyptian troops arrived. In response, rebel commander Qasim had several of the defectors among his ranks killed. Ibrahim Pasha's troops stormed the hill and the rebels (mostly members of the Qasim, Jarrar, Jayyusi and Barqawi families) were routed, suffering 300 fatalities. In 1838 it was noted as a  village, Zeita,  in the western Esh-Sha'rawiyeh administrative region, north of Nablus.

In 1870 Victor Guérin  found here a village with 600 inhabitants. He further noted: "Here I found, just as at Jett, an ancient capital hollowed out to make a mortar, and used for the same purpose. A very good  well, constructed of cut stone, seems ancient."

In 1882,  the PEF's Survey of Western Palestine (SWP)  described it as: "a good-sized village on high ground at the edge of the plain. It is surrounded with fig-gardens, and has olives to the south. It would appear to be an ancient place, having tombs to the east. The supply is principally from wells, but there is a small spring ('Ain esh Shabutbut) on the south-west. [..]  Two sacred places exist to the south side of the village."

British Mandate era
In the 1922 census of Palestine conducted  by the British Mandate authorities, Zeita had a population of 1,087, all  Muslims, increasing in the 1931 census to 1,165  persons, all Muslim, living in 237 houses.

In the 1945 statistics the population of  Zeita was 1,780 Muslims,  with  6,410  dunams of land  according to an official land and population survey. 782 dunams were plantations and irrigable land, 5,120 used for cereals, while 33 dunams were built-up (urban) land.

Jordanian era
In the wake of the 1948 Arab–Israeli War, and after the 1949 Armistice Agreements, Zeita came under Jordanian rule, together with the rest of the West Bank.

In 1961, the population was  1,814 persons.

Post-1967
After the Six-Day War in 1967, Zeita has been under Israeli occupation.

References

Bibliography

External links
Welcome To Zayta
Zayta, Welcome to Palestine
Survey of Western Palestine, Map 11:  IAA, Wikimedia commons

Towns in the West Bank
Tulkarm Governorate
Municipalities of the State of Palestine